Ultra Bali is an outdoor electronic music festival that is a part of Ultra Music Festival's worldwide expansion, which has now spread to twenty countries. The debut of Ultra Bali took place during 24–25 September 2015 and was held at the Potato Head Beach Club located in Bali, Indonesia. Ultra Bali is an event strictly for those 19 and over. The most recent edition of Ultra Bali took place once again at the Potato Head Beach Club during 15–16 September 2016.

History

2015 
Ultra Bali's first edition lasted two days and featured three stages across the Potato Head Beach Club—Main Stage, Resistance Stage, and the UMF Radio Stage. Tickets for the two-day festival sold out within a week of being on sale, without any announcement of a lineup. The festival featured the likes of Ansolo, Kygo, Vicetone, Fedde Le Grand, Alesso, Gorgon City, James Zabiela, Christian Smith, Mija, A-Trak, Zeds Dead, Skrillex, Henry Saiz, Marc Romboy, and many more. Approximately 10,000 people joined together at the Potato Head Beach Club for Ultra Bali's sold out debut.

2016 
The second edition of Ultra Bali took place during 15–16 September 2016 at the Potato Head Beach Club in Bali, Indonesia once again. Early-bird tickets went on sale on 8 July 2016 and the next tier of tickets followed after. The phase one lineup for Ultra Bali's second edition was announced on 17 July 2016 and included the likes of Afrojack, deadmau5, Dubfire, Martin Garrix, Galantis, Gryffin, Jauz, Marshmello, Matador, Nic Fanciulli, Nicole Moudaber, Reboot, Technasia, and Thomas Jack. There were two stages at the second edition of Ultra Bali—Mainstage and the Resistance stage.

See also 
 List of electronic music festivals
 Ultra Music Festival
 Russell Faibisch
 Ultra Brasil
 Ultra Buenos Aires
 Ultra Chile
 Ultra Europe
 Ultra Japan
 Ultra Korea
 Ultra Singapore
 Ultra South Africa
 Road to Ultra

References

External links 
 Ultra Worldwide
 Ultra Music Festival
 Ultra Bali
 Resistance

Music festivals established in 2015
Electronic music festivals in Indonesia